The Stadion Ruchu (Ruch Stadium), also known as the Stadion przy Cichej (Cicha Street Stadium), is a multi-purpose stadium in the Batory district of the town Chorzów, Poland. Built in the years 1934-1935 for the successful Ruch Wielkie Hajduki team and currently is also used mostly for football matches and serves as the home of that club, now known as Ruch Chorzów. The stadium has a capacity of 9,300 people.

References 

Buildings and structures in Chorzów
Chorzów
Multi-purpose stadiums in Poland
Sports venues in Silesian Voivodeship